Maurice Valency (22 March 1903 – 28 September 1996) was a playwright, author, critic, and popular professor of Comparative Literature at Columbia University, best known for his award-winning adaptations of plays by Jean Giraudoux and Friedrich Dürrenmatt.   He wrote several original plays, but is best known for his adaptations of the plays of others. Valency's version of The Madwoman of Chaillot would become the basis of the Jerry Herman musical Dear World on Broadway.

He is also noted for his book The Flower and the Castle: An Introduction to Modern Drama.  John Gassner in his review of this book said that Mr. Valency brought to his work "a lifetime of study and experience as well as a viewpoint both Olympian and engaged."  Valency also wrote television plays, adaptations of librettos, novels, and academic works on Chekhov, Strindberg, Ibsen and Shaw.

Life
Maurice Valency was educated in New York City, getting a Bachelor of Arts degree in 1923 at City College, and at Columbia University getting a Bachelor of Laws degree in 1927 (Valency was a member of the New York bar), and a Ph.D. in 1938.  In 1936 he married the artist Janet Cornell; they remained married for 60 years until Valency's death in New York City at the age of 93.

Valency was a professor of comparative literature at Columbia and also taught dramatic literature at Juilliard and at Brooklyn College.  He spoke seven languages.

Awards
 New York Drama Critics Circle Award for best foreign play, 1949, for his adaptation of The Madwoman of Chaillot by Jean Giraudoux
 New York Drama Critics Circle Award for best foreign play, 1954, for his adaptation of Ondine by Jean Giraudoux
 New York Drama Critics Circle Award for best foreign play, 1959, for his adaptation of The Visit by Friedrich Dürrenmatt
 Tony Award nomination for Best Play, 1959, for his adaptation of The Visit
 Ford Foundation Fellowship, 1958
 Guggenheim Fellowship, 1960

Works

Adaptations
 The Madwoman of Chaillot (Jean Giraudoux), Pub: Random House, New York, 1947, OCLC Num: 639892557
 The Enchanted: a comedy in three acts (Jean Giraudoux), Pub: Random House, New York, 1950, OCLC Num: 818215
 The Virtuous Island: a play in one act (Jean Giraudoux), Pub: Samuel French, New York, 1956, OCLC Num: 2070415
 The Queen's Gambit: a romantic comedy in three acts (Eugène Scribe), Pub: Samuel French, New York, 1956, OCLC Num:: 504510488
 Four plays: The Madwoman of Chaillot, The Apollo of Bellac, The Enchanted, Ondine, adapted, and with an introduction by Maurice Valency (Jean Giraudoux), Pub: Hill and Wang, New York, 1958, OCLC Num: 70459302
 The visit: a play in three acts (Friedrich Dürrenmatt), Pub: Random House, New York, 1958, OCLC Num: 1379852
 Feathertop, Pub: Dramatists Play Service, New York, 1998
 La Périchole (opera libretto), The American University Theatre, 1970, OCLC Num: 690595158
 The Reluctant King (opera libretto)

Original works
 The palace of pleasure: an anthology of the novella (with Henry Levtow), Pub: Capricorn Books, New York, 1960, OCLC Num: 296836
 In praise of love: an introduction to the love-poetry of the Renaissance, Pub: Macmillan, New York, 1958, OCLC Num: 313778
 The Thracian horses, Pub: Dramatists Play Service, New York, 1963, OCLC Num: 2684110
 The flower and the castle: an introduction to modern drama, Pub: Macmillan, New York, 1963, OCLC Num: 330053
 The breaking string: the plays of Chekhov, Pub: Oxford University Press, New York, 1966, OCLC Num: 712186
 The cart and the trumpet: the plays of George Bernard Shaw, Pub: Oxford University Press, New York, 1973, OCLC Num: 627998
 Savonarola (play), 1974
 Regarding Electra: a play in one or two acts, Pub: Dramatists Play Service, New York, 1976, OCLC Num: 2918272
 Conversation with a sphinx: a play in one act, Pub: Dramatists Play Service, New York, 1980, OCLC Num: 6925360
 The end of the world: an introduction to contemporary drama, Pub: Oxford University Press, New York, 1980, OCLC Num: 5051656
 Ashby: a novel, Pub: Schocken Books, New York, 1984, 
 Julie: a novel, Pub: New Amsterdam, New York, 1989, 
 Tragedy, Pub: New York: New Amsterdam, 1991,

Television plays
 1951: Battleship Bismarck CBS-TV
 1953: Toine (Omnibus), CBS-TV
 1953: The Man without a Country (Omnibus), CBS-TV
 1954: The Apollo of Bellac (Omnibus), CBS-TV
 1955: She Stoops to Conquer (Omnibus), CBS-TV
 1956: The Virtuous Island (for Omnibus), ABC-TV
 1957: The Second Stranger (General Electric Theater), CBS-TV
 1957: Feathertop (General Electric Theatre), CBS-TV (adaptation of story by Nathaniel Hawthorne)

References

External links
 , Retrieved 25 September 2010
 , Retrieved 11 June 2017
 , Retrieved 25 September 2010
 Maurice Valency at doollee.com, the playwright's data base, Retrieved 25 September 2010
 Finding aid to Maurice Valency papers at Columbia University. Rare Book & Manuscript Library.

Writers from New York City
Tony Award winners
Columbia Law School alumni
City College of New York alumni
1903 births
1996 deaths
20th-century American dramatists and playwrights
20th-century American translators
Juilliard School faculty
Brooklyn College faculty
American male dramatists and playwrights
20th-century American male writers